The Roman Catholic Diocese of Simdega is a diocese located in the city of Simdega in the Ecclesiastical province of Ranchi in India.

History
 May 28, 1993: Established as Diocese of Simdega from the Metropolitan Archdiocese of Ranchi

Leadership
 Bishops of Simdega (Latin Rite)
 Bishop Vincent Barwa (February 11, 2008 – present)
 Bishop Joseph Minj (May 28, 1993 – February 11, 2008)

References

External links
 GCatholic.org 
 Catholic Hierarchy 

Roman Catholic dioceses in India
Christian organizations established in 1993
Roman Catholic dioceses and prelatures established in the 20th century
Christianity in Jharkhand
1993 establishments in Bihar
Simdega district